The Collège international de philosophie (Ciph), located in Paris' 5th arrondissement, is a tertiary education institute placed under the trusteeship of the French government department of research and chartered under the French 1901 Law on associations. It was co-founded in 1983 by Jacques Derrida, François Châtelet, Jean-Pierre Faye and Dominique Lecourt in an attempt to re-think the teaching of philosophy in France, and to liberate it from any institutional authority (most of all from the university). Its financing is mainly through public funds. Its chairs or "directors of program" are competitively elected for 6 years (non renewable), following an international open call for proposals (every third year). Proposals are free and directors are elected after a collegial, peer-assessment of their value for philosophy. The College recognizes that philosophy is better served by being located at "intersections" such as Philosophy/Science, or Philosophy/Law. Proposals must respond to this exigency of "intersection" as wished by Jacques Derrida. The College has few registered students, who may receive the Diplôme du Collège international de philosophie, which is not a university degree but may be, in some cases, validated by French or foreign universities.  Otherwise, attendance to seminars is open and free.

Raison d'être 

According to Derrida, he was inspired by the Cerisy study center to found this new institution, in the midst of governmental threats on the teaching of philosophy in the last class of high school. Thus was created this College, "from a non-governmental origin, with an international span, an institution which is not destined to oppose itself, but to balance, question, open, occupy margins ; where we would privilege infrequent approaches or approaches yet unlegitimized by the university, new objects, new themes, new fields; where we would treat more of intersections than of academic disciplines".

Presidents of the Assembly of Directors

Jacques Derrida
Jean-François Lyotard
François Jullien
Jean-Claude Milner
François Noudelmann

Current Directors

Past Directors

 Giorgio Agamben
 Alain Badiou
 Sidi Mohamed Barkat
 Geoffrey Bennington
 Barbara Cassin 
 François Châtelet
 Joseph Cohen
 José Gil
 Olivier LeCour Grandmaison
 Robert Harvey
 Natacha Michel
 Pascal Michon
 Antonio Negri
 Catherine Perret
 Philippe-Joseph Salazar

See also

Collège philosophique
Université populaire de Caen

References

Further reading

 Le rapport bleu - Les sources historiques et théoriques du Collège international de philosophie (Jacques Derrida, Jean-Pierre Faye, François Châtelet), PUF, Paris, 1998, 
Derrida, Jacques. Du droit à la philosophie (Who's Afraid of Philosophy?)

External links
 Official website, retrieved 30 October 2019.
 "Collection Collège International de Philosophie" books published by PUF

Alternative education
Education in Paris
Buildings and structures in the 5th arrondissement of Paris
Philosophical schools and traditions
Educational institutions established in 1983
Philosophy schools
1983 establishments in France